Palestine is an unincorporated town in Brookville Township, Franklin County, Indiana.

History
Palestine was platted in 1849. It was named for the geographic region of Palestine.

Geography

References

Unincorporated communities in Franklin County, Indiana
Unincorporated communities in Indiana